SeaWorld Abu Dhabi is an upcoming marine life theme park and animal research, rescue & rehabilitation center that is slated to open in 2023 on Yas Island in Abu Dhabi, the capital of the United Arab Emirates. It will be the first SeaWorld park outside of the United States and the first park without killer whales. The Abu Dhabi-based company Miral Asset Management will be the owner and operator of SeaWorld Abu Dhabi under a license from SeaWorld Parks & Entertainment.

History
In 2007, SeaWorld Parks & Entertainment announced a proposed theme park in  Dubai, including a manmade island shaped like an Orca hosting Busch Gardens, Aquatica, and SeaWorld. The project was soon cancelled due to the 2007–2008 financial crisis.

On December 13, 2016, SeaWorld Parks & Entertainment announced a new partnership with Miral to bring SeaWorld Abu Dhabi to Yas Island. The park would be situated near the Island's other attractions such as Ferrari World. SeaWorld licensed the brand to Miral who fully funded the project. On October 5, 2020, SeaWorld Parks & Entertainment announced that SeaWorld Abu Dhabi was "64% finished" and would finish construction in 2022. By September 2022, it was announced that the park was 90% completed and set to open in 2023.

In 2023, Miral announced the opening of Yas SeaWorld Research & Rescue marine research, rescue, rehabilitation and return center. In February 2023, the park received three captive walruses from parks in Canada.

Attractions 
Once completed, the park will feature six marine environments that will be home to immersive experiences and interactive exhibits. In addition, the park will host 150 species of marine animals, who will live in environments that replicate their natural habitats.

Yas SeaWorld Research and Rescue 
Yas SeaWorld Research and Rescue was opened in February 2023 to rescue injured, unwell and orphaned marine animals in the Arabian Gulf. The only one of its kind in the region, the center focuses on rehabilitating and returning healthy animals to their natural habitats.  It also seeks to educate the public about conserving the UAE’s marine wildlife and ecosystems. 

The  facility is spearheaded by marine scientists, zoologists, trained rescue personnel and animal care experts with a special emphasis on marine biodiversity, ecosystem resilience, sensitive wildlife conservation, critical habitats restoration, fisheries, pollution and wildlife health. Globally, SeaWorld has rescued and rehabilitated 40,000 marine animals since 1965. 

Within the research center are three dry labs, a wet lab, an aquaculture facility and rescue pools for big and small marine creatures, supported by a fleet of rescue vehicles (including rescue boats) and a veterinary hospital on site.

References

Amusement parks in the United Arab Emirates
Proposed buildings and structures in the United Arab Emirates
SeaWorld Parks & Entertainment
Tourist attractions in Abu Dhabi